The Kokomini (Gugumini) are reported to have been an indigenous Australian people of the state of Queensland, though some indications suggest the term may refer to a loose confederation of tribal groups.

Name
The ethnonym Gugumini means good/intelligible speech.

Country
The Gugumini are estimated by Norman Tindale to have had tribal grounds stretching over about  along the middle Palmer and Mitchell rivers, extending westwards to the area where the two meet. Their eastern limits were around Mount Mulgrave and Palmerville. Palmer reported their main camp to be at the head of Annie Creek and King River. Ursula McConnel wrote of the area between Wulbur and Yurgo as that of the Koko-mini and Kokowara.

Customs
The Kokomini were said to have used a concoction drawn from Darwin stringybark leaves as a remedy for fever.

History of contact
Kokomini territory was occupied by white settlers in 1874. Conflicts ensued as the Kokomini speared livestock introduced for grazing on their land, resulting in war between the two. The war was still ongoing a decade later, with the rule established that the indigenous Kokokmini had no right to be "let in" to their land, and a good many were shot down, putatively in "retaliation" for the loss of cattle and horses. The Queensland politician Edward Palmer ran a station in the area in the 1880s.

Alternative names
 Koko-minni
 Koogominny, Kookaminnie, Koogaminny
 Koogobatha, Koogobathy
 Mirkin
 Akunkun, Akoon-koon
 Akoonkool
 Kookawarra. (Wakara exonym, with the pejorative sense of "poor speakers")

Some words
 innar (kangaroo)
 oota (wild dog)
 athee. (father)
 among. (mother)

Notes

Citations

Sources

Aboriginal peoples of Queensland